Aechmea zebrina is a plant species in the genus Aechmea. This species is native to Ecuador and Colombia; it is relatively common in the lowland Amazon region of eastern Ecuador and southern Colombia.

Aechmea zebrina is a large epiphytic bromeliad that can grow more than 1 metre tall and wide and hold nearly 4 litres of water between its leaves. It typically occurs in the upper canopy of overstory trees at heights of 18–45 m. A single tree can host more than 150 Aechmea zebrina.

Cultivars
 Aechmea 'Hercules'
 Aechmea 'Orinoco'
 × Neomea 'Valli'

References

zebrina
Flora of Ecuador
Flora of Colombia
Plants described in 1953